Grigor Hamam or Grigol Hamam  (d. 897) was ruler of Hereti (Arran) between 893–897. He was one of the descendants of the princely family of the Mihranids. Prince Grigor Hamam occupied large part of Arran and even restored the Albanian kingship for a while.

Family 
Grigor married an unknown princess, with whom he had five sons:

Issue 
 Apuli — was killed by his brother Smbat. 
 Smbat — ruler of the lands around Gandzasar, Lower Khachen. 
 Sahak Sevada — ruler of Gardman and Parisos. 
 Vasak — ruler over the Upper Khachen.  
 Adarnase the Patrikios — ruler of Hereti.

References

Monarchs of Hereti
897 deaths
Year of birth unknown
House of Aranshahik
9th-century Armenian people
9th-century people from Georgia (country)